Jhoni Marchinko is an  American screenwriter who has worked on several television shows, including Will & Grace and Murphy Brown.

Career
She started out, writing material for Dennis Miller, and later Louie Anderson. She worked as a writer and story editor on Ink. She worked on 2 Broke Girls as a writer and consulting producer. In 2020, she worked on AJ and the Queen as a writer and executive producer, with RuPaul starring. On March 6, 2020, Netflix announced that the series had been cancelled.

References

External links

Emmy Award winners
American television writers
American women television writers
American television producers
American women television producers
Living people
Year of birth missing (living people)
21st-century American women